The 2008 Luch-Energiya Vladivostok season was the club's 4th season in the Russian Premier League, and their third since 1993. Luch-Energiya Vladivostok finished the season in 16th, being relegated to the First Division for the 2009 season. In the 2008–09 Russian Cup, Luch-Energiya were knocked out at the Round of 32 by Baltika Kaliningrad.

Season events
Prior to the start of the season, Zoran Vulić was appointed as the clubs new manager. After Vulić left his role as manager, Semen Altman was appointed as his replacement on 10 October.

In July, Luch-Energiya signed André Alves, Leandro, Josip Lukačević, Andrei Streltsov and Dragan Stojkić after all impressed on trial during Luch-Energiya's training camp in Austria.

On 28 August, goalkeeper Aleksey Polyakov joined Luch-Energiya on loan from Lokomotiv Moscow until the end of the season.

Squad

On loan

Left club during season

Transfers

In

Loans in

Out

Loans out

Released

Competitions

Premier League

Results by round

Results

League table

Russian Cup

2008-09

Squad statistics

Appearances and goals

|-
|colspan="14"|Players away from the club on loan:
|-
|colspan="14"|Players who appeared for Luch-Energiya Vladivostok but left during the season:

|}

Goal scorers

Clean sheets

Disciplinary record

References

FC Luch Vladivostok seasons
Luch-Energiya Vladivostok